Continente is a retail chain that belongs to Sonae Distribuição, the largest retailer in Portugal.  The hypermarket Continente chain is in spread all over continental Portugal as well on Madeira and in the Azores. The supermarket chain Continente Modelo, formerly named just Modelo, has also a nationwide presence. Sonae Distribuição, SGPS, SA, is a subsidiary company of Sonae SGPS.

History
Sonae Distribuição started in 1985 by the merger of two large retailers, Modelo and Continente. Modelo was owned by the Sonae holding, while Continente was the Portuguese and Spanish operation of the French retailer Promodès, known by the ensign Continent elsewhere.

Thus, it was part-owned by its French competitor, Carrefour, who sold their stake to Sonae for €345 million on 16 November 2004.

In 2008, Carrefour sold its Portuguese retail ventures existing under the Carrefour ensign to Sonae. Continente used to have one branch in Dubai, which was later purchased by Carrefour. The Continente ensign disappeared from Spain after the 1999 Carrefour-Promodès merge.

Store formats
The supermarket chain operates three main store formats; regular Continente stores, Continente Bom Dia (convenience stores and smaller supermarkets in urban locations, designed for more frequent purchases of everyday life) and Continente Modelo stores (hypermarkets of proximity, with an area of about ).

At the end of its 2009/10 financial year Continente store portfolio was as follows.

References

External links 
 Sonae Distribuição SGPS, SA corporate site
 Continente Online
 Continente Magazine Online

Supermarkets of Portugal
Department stores of Portugal
Distribution companies of Portugal
Retail companies established in 1985
Hypermarkets
1985 establishments in Portugal